Tasuj Rural District is a rural district (dehestan) in the Central District of Kavar County, Fars Province, Iran. At the 2006 census, its population was 20,847, in 4,406 families.  The rural district has 29 villages.

References 

Rural Districts of Fars Province
Kavar County